Martin "Marty" Louis Horn (born March 27, 1963) is a former American football quarterback who played for one season in the National Football League for the Philadelphia Eagles in 1987. He played college football at Lehigh.

Early life and high school
Horn was born in Orange, New Jersey and grew up in Short Hills, New Jersey. He attended Millburn High School. After graduating from Millburn he completed a postgraduate year at Milford Academy.

College career
Horn was a four-year starter for the Lehigh Engineers, taking over as a freshman after the team's first string quarterback was injured in a game against Penn. As a sophomore he was named an honorable mention All-American and finished third in Division I-AA in passer rating as a junior. Horn was named an honorable mention All-American again as a senior in 1985. He finished his collegiate career with 9,120 yards and 62 touchdowns, both school records.

Professional career
Horn was signed by the New York Jets as an undrafted free agent in 1986 after a tryout with the team, but was cut during training camp. He was re-signed by the Jets during the 1987 offseason but was waived again at the end of the preseason. Horn was signed by the Philadelphia Eagles as a replacement player during the 1987 NFL players strike. He served as the backup to Scott Tinsley and appeared in one game, completing five of eleven passes for 68 yards in a 41–22 loss to the Dallas Cowboys on October 11, 1987. Horn was released after the strike ended.

Personal life
After retiring from football Horn joined his brothers in running two restaurants owned by his family in West Orange, New Jersey. He also served as an analyst on Lehigh football broadcasts for 20 years. Horn is the offensive coordinator and quarterbacks coach at Madison High School and coached both of his sons.

References

External links
Lehigh Hall of Fame biography

1963 births
Living people
Players of American football from New Jersey
American football quarterbacks
Lehigh Mountain Hawks football players
New York Jets players
Philadelphia Eagles players
National Football League replacement players
People from Millburn, New Jersey
Millburn High School alumni